Eclipses: Astronomically and Astrologically Considered and Explained (1915) is an astrological text by famous English astrologer Walter Gorn Old, otherwise known as Sepharial. The book claims to teach the readers how to predict world events with solar and lunar eclipses.

Basic Theory of the Book 

There are two core ideas provided in this book:
 Whenever an outer planet (usually Mars) conjoins or opposite the spot of a recent eclipse in longitude, then a natural disaster or local conflict is bound to happen. The location of the incident is usually a long the path on which the eclipse is most visible.
 Whenever a solar or lunar eclipse makes a turbulent aspect (e.g. square or opposition) to a person's natal chart, it usually indicates an unfavourable trend to that person, even though the effect might not be immediate.

Examples of Mars activating the eclipse point 

Here are two example from the book. The first one is the Balkan War started in 1912, which was just three years before the book was published. Sepharial thought that it was related to a solar eclipse in 1912. (Key: SE = solar eclipse, LE = lunar eclipse)

The second example is the First World War, just one year before the book was published. Sepharial thought that it was related to a lunar eclipse a few months before the war.

Examples of eclipses transiting natal charts 
Sepharial used the example of German Kaiser Wilhelm II to show how eclipses could bring bad luck to a person by bad transits.

References 

1915 non-fiction books
Astrological texts